Robert Emil Hansen   (25 February 1860 – 1926) was a Danish composer and cellist. He was the brother of Agnes Adler.

Selected works

Symphony No. 1 in D minor (before 1880)
Cello concerto (1881)
Piano Trio (1882)
Phædra (concert overture, 1884)
Piano concerto (1885)
Violin sonata (1885)
Piano quintet (1886)
Suite for Orchestra (1887)
String Quartet (1891)
Symphony No. 2 (1892)
Trio in D minor (flute, violin and cello - 1910)

See also
List of Danish composers
 Article In Danish in the Danish Lexicon

References

This article was initially translated from the Danish Wikipedia.

External links
 

Danish composers
Male composers
Danish classical cellists
1860 births
1926 deaths